Klimeschiopsis terroris is a moth in the family Gelechiidae. It was described by Friedrich Hartig in 1938. It is found in Spain.

The wingspan is 11 mm. The forewings are black with three white patches. The hindwings are shining grey.

References

Klimeschiopsis
Moths described in 1938